Dhullu Baskot is a village development committee in Baglung District in the Dhaulagiri Zone of central Nepal.

References

Populated places in Baglung District